is a passenger railway station located in the town of Ōtoyo, Nagaoka District, Kōchi Prefecture, Japan. It is operated by JR Shikoku and has the station number "D32".

Lines

Layout
The station consists of an island platform serving two tracks. The station building by the side of the tracks serves as a waiting room and also has a kan'i itaku ticket window. A pedestrian level crossing from the station building is used to access the island platform. There is also an enclosed shelter on the island platform for waiting passengers. Beside the station building is a freight platform and third track which is used by track maintenance equipment.

Adjacent stations

History
At this time the station was operated by Japanese Government Railways, later becoming Japanese National Railways (JNR). With the privatization of JNR on 1 April 1987, control of the station passed to JR Shikoku. The original station building burnt down on 2 January 2004. A new building was constructed and opened on 12 March 2005. Students from a local junior high school participated in the design and construction of the new building.

Surrounding area
National Route 32 - runs parallel to the track on the other side of the Ananai River.
Ōtoyo town hall - about 500 metres away on National Route 32.
Sugi no Osugi - a pair of Japanese cedars joined at the base, said to be the world's tallest Japanese cedars and over 3,000 years old. The trees have been designated as a special national monument. The trees served as the inspiration for the design of the present station building. 
Ōtoyo Chōritsu Ōtoyo-chō Junior High School - students from this school participated in the station reconstruction project.

See also
 List of Railway Stations in Japan

References

External links

JR Shikoku timetable 

Railway stations in Kōchi Prefecture
Railway stations in Japan opened in 1932
Ōtoyo, Kōchi